Ali Al-Mdfa (born September 6, 1937) is a Saudi actor, best known for Al-Najdi roles.

Career
Al-Mdfa started his career in the 1970s as the presenter of plays and cultural competitions in the Al-Hilal Club. He is a member of the Association of Culture and Arts and has made several appearances on television, theater and radio.

Life
Al-Mdfa was born Ali Saleh Ali Al-Mdfa in Methnb in Al-Qassim. He is married and has four children

Acting Roles

Series
Al-Tiaf Al-Qarib
Tash Ma Tash
Ghashamsham with Fahad Al-Hayyan

Plays
Tahat Al-Karsi

Movies
Hammoud Wa Muhaimid

References
Riyadh newspaper

1937 births
Saudi Arabian male film actors
Saudi Arabian male stage actors
Saudi Arabian male television actors
Living people
People from Al-Qassim Province